Paul William Bucha (born August 1, 1943) is an American Vietnam War veteran and a recipient of the Medal of Honor. He was a foreign policy adviser to Barack Obama's 2008 presidential campaign.

Early life and education
Bucha was born on August 1, 1943, in Washington, D.C. He is of Croatian descent; his paternal grandfather immigrated to the United States from the Croatian town of Našice. He graduated from Ladue Horton Watkins High School in 1961. An all-American swimmer in high school, Bucha was offered athletic scholarships to several universities but turned them down and attended the United States Military Academy at West Point. After graduation he earned a Master of Business Administration at Stanford University before beginning his military career at Fort Campbell.

Vietnam War and Medal of Honor
Bucha was sent to Vietnam in 1967 as a captain and commander of Company D, 3rd Battalion, 187th Infantry Regiment. On March 16, 1968, he and his company of 89 men were dropped by helicopter southwest of Phước Vĩnh, in Bình Dương Province. The area was believed to be a North Vietnamese stronghold and Bucha's unit was tasked with seeking out and engaging the enemy forces. For two days Company D encountered light resistance as it cleared North Vietnamese positions. On the afternoon of March 18, the company's lead group of about twelve men stumbled upon a full North Vietnamese army battalion that had stopped to camp for the night. The lead element came under heavy fire and was pinned down. Bucha crawled toward them and destroyed a North Vietnamese bunker. He returned to the company perimeter and ordered a withdrawal to a more defensible position. Throughout the night he encouraged his men, distributed ammunition, and directed artillery and helicopter gunship fire. At one point he stood exposed and used flashlights to direct helicopters which were evacuating the wounded and bringing in supplies. The next morning, as the North Vietnamese forces withdrew, he led a party to rescue those soldiers who had been cut off from the rest of the company.

Once his tour in the Vietnam War ended in April 1970, Bucha returned to the United States and taught Political Science at West Point. It was during this time that he learned he had been awarded the Medal of Honor for his actions in the battle near Phuoc Vinh. The medal was presented to him on May 14, 1970, by President Richard Nixon.

Later life

Bucha left the army in 1972. He worked as chief of operations in Iran for Ross Perot's company, Electronic Data Systems (EDS). When several EDS employees were detained during the 1979 Iranian Revolution, he was involved in the effort to free them. He then started his own company, which found American partners for foreign investors. With a French real estate developer he formed a joint venture which began the development of Port Liberté, New Jersey. He later worked as chairman of the board of Wheeling-Pittsburgh Steel Corporation and was president of the Congressional Medal of Honor Society. He sits on the Board of Directors to a number of organizations and companies, including Veterans Advantage, a Public Benefit Corporation that creates exclusive benefits and discounts for the military community, of which he has been an advisory board member since its founding by Lin and Scott Higgins in 2000. 

Bucha is active in political affairs and campaigned for Barack Obama during the 2008 presidential election. Bucha unsuccessfully ran as a Republican for the United States House of Representatives in New York in 1993.

Bucha is an honorary member of the Rhode Island Commandery of the Military Order of Foreign Wars. He lives in Ridgefield, Connecticut, with his wife Cynthia. He has four children.

See also

List of Medal of Honor recipients for the Vietnam War

References

External links

Interview at the Pritzker Military Museum & Library on March 16, 2006
 Interview at the Pritzker Military Museum & Library on February 26, 2009

1943 births
Living people
American people of Croatian descent
Ladue Horton Watkins High School alumni
United States Military Academy alumni
Stanford University alumni
United States Army officers
United States Army personnel of the Vietnam War
United States Army Medal of Honor recipients
Vietnam War recipients of the Medal of Honor
Military personnel from Connecticut